The 1957 Gael Linn Cup is a representative competition for elite level participants in the women's team field sport of camogie, was won by Leinster, who defeated Munster in the final, played at Cahir.

Arrangements
Munster defeated Connacht, 2–1 to 1–2, and Leinster defeated Ulster 4–0 to 2–0 at Parnell Park in the semi-finals.. On a miserably cold and wet afternoon in Cahir, Leinster won their second title by 5–1 to 3–1. It was a step in securing the future of the fledgeling competition. Agnes Hourigan wrote in the Irish Press: It was only in the last five minutes that Leinster got on top in a game which produced play of a high standard despite an almost continuous downpour. The standard of play and the opportunity to see players who would not have the opportunity to play in an Al-Ireland final were enough to silence those who doubted the wisdom of inter-provincial camogie.

Final stages

|}

References

External links
 Camogie Association

1957 in camogie
1957